Major-General Robert John Collins CMG DSO (22 August 1880 – 6 March 1950) was a British Army officer who became Commandant of the Staff College, Camberley.

Military career
Educated at Marlborough College, Collins, after service with the 6th Warwick Militia during the Second Boer War, was commissioned into the Royal Berkshire Regiment in 1899. He fought in the Second Boer War and then served with the Egyptian Army until 1911 and attended the Staff College, Camberley from 1913 to 1914, where J. F. C. Fuller was one of his fellow students. He took part in the First World War, becoming Chief Instructor at the Staff School in Cambridge during the last year of the war. He was appointed Commander of 73rd Brigade later in 1918 and became an instructor at the Staff College, Camberley in 1919 before taking up a post as Director of Military Training in India in 1924. He went on to be Commandant of the Small Arms School in 1929 and General Officer Commanding (GOC) of the 3rd (Meerut) Indian Division in 1934 before retiring in 1938. He was recalled at the start of the Second World War to be (GOC) of the 61st Infantry Division followed by being made Commandant of the Staff College, Camberley before retiring again in 1941.

He was one of the founders, with Phoebe Cusden, of the Reading Düsseldorf Association which provided help from the people of Reading in Berkshire for the people of Düsseldorf in Germany which had been heavily bombed during the War. He was also author of Lord Wavell, 1883-1941 - A military biography (Hodder and Stoughton, London, 1947).

Family
In 1912 he married Violet Agnes Monro.

References

Bibliography

External links
Generals of World War II

|-

|-

1880 births
1950 deaths
British Army generals of World War I
British Army generals of World War II
British Army personnel of the Second Boer War
Commandants of the Staff College, Camberley
Companions of the Distinguished Service Order
Companions of the Order of St Michael and St George
Deputy Lieutenants of Berkshire
Graduates of the Staff College, Camberley
People educated at Marlborough College
Royal Berkshire Regiment officers
British Army major generals
Academics of the Staff College, Camberley